This is a list of United States senators from Maryland, which ratified the United States Constitution April 28, 1788, becoming the seventh state to do so. To provide for continuity of government, the framers divided senators into staggered classes that serve six-year terms, and Maryland's senators are in the first and third classes. Before the passage of the Seventeenth Amendment to the United States Constitution in 1913, which allowed for direct election of senators, Maryland's senators were chosen by the Maryland General Assembly, which ratified the amendment on April 1, 2010. Until the assembly appointed George L. Wellington of Cumberland in 1897, senators in class 3 were chosen from the Eastern Shore while senators in class 1 were chosen from the remainder of the state. Barbara Mikulski has been Maryland's longest-serving senator (1987–2017).

List of senators

|- style="height:2em"
! rowspan=2 | 1
| rowspan=2 align=left | Charles Carroll
| rowspan=2  | Pro-Admin.
| rowspan=2 nowrap | Mar 4, 1789 –Nov 30, 1792
| Elected in 1788.
| 1
| 
| rowspan=5 | 1
| rowspan=5 | Elected in 1788.
| rowspan=9 nowrap | Mar 4, 1789 –Dec 10, 1797
| rowspan=9  | Pro-Admin.
| rowspan=9 align=right | John Henry
! rowspan=9 | 1

|- style="height:2em"
| Re-elected in 1791.Resigned to remain in the Maryland Senate.
| rowspan=7 | 2
| rowspan=3 

|- style="height:2em"
| colspan=3 | Vacant
| nowrap | Nov 30, 1792 –Jan 10, 1793
|  

|- style="height:2em"
! rowspan=3 | 2
| rowspan=3 align=left | Richard Potts| rowspan=3  | Pro-Admin.
| rowspan=3 nowrap | Jan 10, 1793 –Oct 24, 1796
| rowspan=3 | Elected to finish Carroll's term.Resigned.

|- style="height:2em"
| 

|- style="height:2em"
| rowspan=3 
| rowspan=8 | 2
| rowspan=4 | Re-elected in 1795.Resigned to become Governor of Maryland.

|- style="height:2em"
| colspan=3 | Vacant
| nowrap | Oct 24, 1796 –Nov 30, 1796
|  

|- style="height:2em"
! rowspan=8 | 3
| rowspan=8 align=left | John Eager Howard| rowspan=8  | Federalist
| rowspan=8 nowrap | Nov 30, 1796 –Mar 3, 1803
| Elected to finish Carroll's term.

|- style="height:2em"
| rowspan=7 | Re-elected in 1796.Lost re-election.
| rowspan=7 | 3
| rowspan=2 

|- style="height:2em"
| rowspan=2 | Elected to finish Henry's term.Resigned.
| rowspan=2 nowrap | Dec 11, 1797 –Dec 1, 1800
| rowspan=2  | Federalist
| rowspan=2 align=right | James Lloyd
! rowspan=2 | 2

|- style="height:2em"
| rowspan=3 

|- style="height:2em"
|  
| nowrap | Dec 1, 1800 –Dec 12, 1800
| colspan=3 | Vacant

|- style="height:2em"
| Elected to finish Henry's term.
| rowspan=2 nowrap | Dec 12, 1800 –Nov 19, 1801
| rowspan=2  | Federalist
| rowspan=2 align=right | William Hindman
! rowspan=2 | 3

|- style="height:2em"
| rowspan=2 
| rowspan=6 | 3
| Appointed to fill the vacancy after the Legislature failed to elect.Retired when successor elected.

|- style="height:2em"
| rowspan=3 | Elected to finish term.Resigned to become Governor of Maryland.
| rowspan=3 nowrap | Nov 19, 1801 –Nov 12, 1806
| rowspan=3  | Democratic-Republican
| rowspan=3 align=right | Robert Wright
! rowspan=3 | 4

|- style="height:2em"
! rowspan=9 | 4
| rowspan=9 align=left | Samuel Smith
| rowspan=9  | Democratic-Republican
| rowspan=9 nowrap | Mar 4, 1803 –Mar 3, 1815
| rowspan=5 | Elected in 1802.
| rowspan=5 | 4
| 

|- style="height:2em"
| rowspan=3 

|- style="height:2em"
|  
| nowrap | Nov 12, 1806 –Nov 25, 1806
| colspan=3 | Vacant

|- style="height:2em"
| Elected to finish Wright's term.
| rowspan=4 nowrap | Nov 25, 1806 –Mar 3, 1813
| rowspan=4  | Democratic-Republican
| rowspan=4 align=right | Philip Reed
! rowspan=4 | 5

|- style="height:2em"
| 
| rowspan=3 | 4
| rowspan=3 | Re-elected in 1806.

|- style="height:2em"
| rowspan=4 | Re-elected in 1809.
| rowspan=4 | 5
| 

|- style="height:2em"
| 

|- style="height:2em"
| rowspan=2 
| rowspan=7 | 5
| Legislature failed to elect.
| nowrap | Mar 3, 1813 –May 21, 1813
| colspan=3 | Vacant

|- style="height:2em"
| rowspan=6 | Elected in 1813 to finish term.
| rowspan=6 nowrap | May 21, 1813 –Mar 3, 1819
| rowspan=6  | Federalist
| rowspan=6 align=right | Robert Henry Goldsborough
! rowspan=6 | 6

|- style="height:2em"
| colspan=3 | Vacant
| nowrap | Mar 4, 1815 –Jan 29, 1816
| Legislature failed to elect
| rowspan=8 | 6
| rowspan=4 

|- style="height:2em"
! 5
| align=left | Robert Goodloe Harper
| | Federalist
| nowrap | Jan 29, 1816 –Dec 6, 1816
| Elected to finish term.Resigned.

|- style="height:2em"
| colspan=3 | Vacant
| nowrap | Dec 6, 1816 –Dec 20, 1816
|  

|- style="height:2em"
! rowspan=3 | 6
| rowspan=3 align=left | Alexander Hanson
| rowspan=3  | Federalist
| rowspan=3 nowrap | Dec 20, 1816 –Apr 23, 1819
| rowspan=3 | Elected to finish Harper's term.Died.

|- style="height:2em"
| 

|- style="height:2em"
| rowspan=3 
| rowspan=7 | 6
| rowspan=2 | Legislature did not elect until after the term began.
| rowspan=2 nowrap | Mar 4, 1819 –Dec 20, 1819
| rowspan=2 colspan=3 | Vacant

|- style="height:2em"
| colspan=3 | Vacant
| nowrap | Apr 23, 1819 –Dec 21, 1819
|  

|- style="height:2em"
! rowspan=2 | 7
| rowspan=2 align=left | William Pinkney
| rowspan=2  | Democratic-Republican
| rowspan=2 nowrap | Dec 20, 1819 –Feb 25, 1822
| Elected in 1819 to finish Harper's term.
| rowspan=5 | Elected late in 1819.
| rowspan=6 nowrap | Dec 21, 1819 –Jan 14, 1826
| rowspan=5  | Democratic-Republican
| rowspan=6 align=right | Edward Lloyd
! rowspan=6 | 7

|- style="height:2em"
| Re-elected in 1821.Died.
| rowspan=7 | 7
| rowspan=3 

|- style="height:2em"
| colspan=3 | Vacant
| nowrap | Feb 25, 1822 –Dec 17, 1822
|  

|- style="height:2em"
! rowspan=8 | 8
| rowspan=8 align=left | Samuel Smith
| rowspan=2  | Democratic-Republican
| rowspan=8 nowrap | Dec 17, 1822 –Mar 3, 1833
| rowspan=5 | Elected to finish Pinkney's term.

|- style="height:2em"
| 

|- style="height:2em"
| rowspan=6  | Jacksonian
| rowspan=3 
| rowspan=5 | 7
| Re-elected in 1825.Resigned.
|  | Jacksonian

|- style="height:2em"
|  
| nowrap | Jan 14, 1826 –Jan 24, 1826
| colspan=3 | Vacant

|- style="height:2em"
| rowspan=3 | Elected to finish Lloyd's term.
| rowspan=5 nowrap | Jan 24, 1826 –Dec 20, 1834
| rowspan=5  | NationalRepublican
| rowspan=5 align=right | Ezekiel F. Chambers
! rowspan=5 | 8

|- style="height:2em"
| rowspan=3 | Re-elected in 1827.
| rowspan=3 | 8
| 

|- style="height:2em"
| 

|- style="height:2em"
| 
| rowspan=7 | 8
| rowspan=2 | Re-elected in 1831.Resigned to become judge of the Maryland Court of Appeals.

|- style="height:2em"
! rowspan=7 | 9
| rowspan=7 align=left | Joseph Kent
| rowspan=6  | NationalRepublican
| rowspan=7 nowrap | Mar 4, 1833 –Nov 24, 1837
| rowspan=7 | Elected in 1833.Died.
| rowspan=9 | 9
| rowspan=3 

|- style="height:2em"
|  
| nowrap | Dec 20, 1834 –Jan 13, 1835
| colspan=3 | Vacant

|- style="height:2em"
| rowspan=2 | Elected to finish Chambers's term.Died.
| rowspan=2 nowrap | Jan 13, 1835 –Oct 5, 1836
| rowspan=2  | NationalRepublican
| rowspan=2 align=right | Robert Henry Goldsborough
! rowspan=2 | 9

|- style="height:2em"
| rowspan=3 

|- style="height:2em"
|  
| nowrap | Oct 5, 1836 –Dec 31, 1836
| colspan=3 | Vacant

|- style="height:2em"
| Elected to finish Chambers's term.
| rowspan=5 nowrap | Dec 31, 1836 –Oct 24, 1840
|  | NationalRepublican
| rowspan=5 align=right | John S. Spence
! rowspan=5 | 10

|- style="height:2em"
|  | Whig
| rowspan=3 
| rowspan=7 | 9
| rowspan=4 | Re-elected in 1837.Died.
| rowspan=4  | Whig

|- style="height:2em"
| colspan=3 | Vacant
| nowrap | Nov 24, 1837 –Jan 4, 1838
|  

|- style="height:2em"
! rowspan=6 | 10
| rowspan=6 align=left | William Duhurst Merrick
| rowspan=6  | Whig
| rowspan=6 nowrap | Jan 4, 1838 –Mar 3, 1845
| Elected to finish Kent's term.

|- style="height:2em"
| rowspan=5 | Re-elected in 1839.
| rowspan=5 | 10
| rowspan=3 

|- style="height:2em"
|  
| nowrap | Oct 24, 1840 –Jan 5, 1841
| colspan=3 | Vacant

|- style="height:2em"
| rowspan=2 | Elected to finish Spence's term.
| rowspan=2 nowrap | Jan 5, 1841 –Mar 3, 1843
| rowspan=2  | Whig
| rowspan=2 align=right | John Leeds Kerr
! rowspan=2 | 11

|- style="height:2em"
| 

|- style="height:2em"
| 
| rowspan=3 | 10
| rowspan=3 | Elected in 1843.
| rowspan=13 nowrap | Mar 4, 1843 –Dec 20, 1862
| rowspan=10  | Whig
| rowspan=13 align=right | James Pearce
! rowspan=13 | 12

|- style="height:2em"
! rowspan=3 | 11
| rowspan=3 align=left | Reverdy Johnson
| rowspan=3  | Whig
| rowspan=3 nowrap | Mar 4, 1845 –Mar 7, 1849
| rowspan=3 | Election year unknown.Resigned to become U.S. Attorney General.
| rowspan=6 | 11
| 

|- style="height:2em"
| 

|- style="height:2em"
| rowspan=4 
| rowspan=6 | 11
| rowspan=6 | Re-elected in 1849.

|- style="height:2em"
| colspan=3 | Vacant
| nowrap | Mar 7, 1849 –Dec 6, 1849
|  

|- style="height:2em"
! 12
| align=left | David Stewart
|  | Democratic
| nowrap | Dec 6, 1849 –Jan 12, 1850
| Appointed to continue Johnson's term.Retired when successor elected.

|- style="height:2em"
! rowspan=4 | 13
| rowspan=4 align=left | Thomas Pratt
| rowspan=4  | Whig
| rowspan=4 nowrap | Jan 12, 1850 –Mar 3, 1857
| Elected to finish Johnson's term.

|- style="height:2em"
| rowspan=3 | Re-elected in 1851.
| rowspan=3 | 12
| 

|- style="height:2em"
| 

|- style="height:2em"
| 
| rowspan=3 | 12
| rowspan=3 | Re-elected in 1855.

|- style="height:2em"
! rowspan=5 | 14
| rowspan=5 align=left | Anthony Kennedy
| rowspan=2  | American
| rowspan=5 nowrap | Mar 4, 1857 –Mar 3, 1863
| rowspan=5 | Election year unknown.
| rowspan=5 | 13
| 
| rowspan=3  | Democratic

|- style="height:2em"
| 

|- style="height:2em"
| rowspan=3  | Unionist
| rowspan=3 
| rowspan=7 | 13
| Re-elected in 1861.Died.

|- style="height:2em"
|  
| nowrap | Dec 20, 1862 –Dec 29, 1862
| colspan=3 | Vacant

|- style="height:2em"
| rowspan=2 | Appointed to continue Pearce's term.Elected in 1864 to finish Pearce's term.Died.
| rowspan=2 nowrap | Dec 29, 1862 –Feb 14, 1865
|  | Unionist
| rowspan=2 align=right | Thomas Holliday Hicks
! rowspan=2 | 13

|- style="height:2em"
! rowspan=6 | 15
| rowspan=6 align=left | Reverdy Johnson
| rowspan=2  | Unionist
| rowspan=6 nowrap | Mar 4, 1863 –Jul 10, 1868
| rowspan=6 | Election year unknown.Resigned to become U.S. Ambassador to the United Kingdom of Great Britain and Ireland.
| rowspan=8 | 14
| rowspan=2 
|  | Unconditional Unionist

|- style="height:2em"
| rowspan=2 |  
| rowspan=2 nowrap | Feb 14, 1865 –Mar 9, 1865
| rowspan=2 colspan=3 | Vacant

|- style="height:2em"
| rowspan=4  | Democratic
| rowspan=2 

|- style="height:2em"
| Elected to finish Hicks's term.
| nowrap | Mar 9, 1865 –Mar 3, 1867
|  | Unconditional Unionist
| rowspan=1 align=right | John Creswell
! 14

|- style="height:2em"
| rowspan=4 
| rowspan=6 | 14
| Philip F. Thomas (D) was elected but failed to qualify due to his support for the Confederacy.
| nowrap | Mar 4, 1867 –Mar 7, 1868
| colspan=3 | Vacant

|- style="height:2em"
| rowspan=5 | Elected to finish Thomas's term.
| rowspan=5 nowrap | Mar 7, 1868 –Mar 3, 1873
| rowspan=5  | Democratic
| rowspan=5 align=right | George Vickers
! rowspan=5 | 15

|- style="height:2em"
| colspan=3 | Vacant
| nowrap | Jul 10, 1868 –Jul 13, 1868
|  

|- style="height:2em"
! 16
| align=left | William Whyte
|  | Democratic
| nowrap | Jul 13, 1868 –Mar 3, 1869
| Appointed to finish Johnson's term.Retired.

|- style="height:2em"
! rowspan=3 | 17
| rowspan=3 align=left | William T. Hamilton
| rowspan=3  | Democratic
| rowspan=3 nowrap | Mar 4, 1869 –Mar 3, 1875
| rowspan=3 | Election year unknown.Retired to run for Governor.
| rowspan=3 | 15
| 

|- style="height:2em"
| 

|- style="height:2em"
| 
| rowspan=3 | 15
| rowspan=3 | Election year unknown.
| rowspan=3 nowrap | Mar 4, 1873 –Mar 3, 1879
| rowspan=3  | Democratic
| rowspan=3 align=right | George R. Dennis
! rowspan=3 | 16

|- style="height:2em"
! rowspan=3 | 18
| rowspan=3 align=left | William Whyte
| rowspan=3  | Democratic
| rowspan=3 nowrap | Mar 4, 1875 –Mar 3, 1881
| rowspan=3 | Elected in 1874.Retired.
| rowspan=3 | 16
| 

|- style="height:2em"
| 

|- style="height:2em"
| 
| rowspan=3 | 16
| rowspan=3 | Elected in 1878.
| rowspan=3 nowrap | Mar 4, 1879 –Mar 3, 1885
| rowspan=3  | Democratic
| rowspan=3 align=right | James Black Groome
! rowspan=3 | 17

|- style="height:2em"
! rowspan=11 | 19
| rowspan=11 align=left | Arthur Pue Gorman
| rowspan=11  | Democratic
| rowspan=11 nowrap | Mar 4, 1881 –Mar 3, 1899
| rowspan=3 | Elected in 1880.
| rowspan=3 | 17
| 

|- style="height:2em"
| 

|- style="height:2em"
| 
| rowspan=4 | 17
| rowspan=3 | Elected in 1884.Re-elected in 1890.Died.
| rowspan=3 nowrap | Mar 4, 1885 –Feb 24, 1891
| rowspan=3  | Democratic
| rowspan=3 align=right | Ephraim Wilson
! rowspan=3 | 18

|- style="height:2em"
| rowspan=5 | Re-elected in 1886.
| rowspan=5 | 18
| 

|- style="height:2em"
| rowspan=2 

|- style="height:2em"
| rowspan=2 |  
| rowspan=2 nowrap | Feb 24, 1891 –Nov 19, 1891
| rowspan=2 colspan=3 | Vacant

|- style="height:2em"
| rowspan=2 
| rowspan=4 | 18

|- style="height:2em"
| rowspan=3 | Appointed to continue Wilson's term.Elected in 1892 to finish Wilson's term.Unknown if retired or lost re-election.
| rowspan=3 nowrap | Nov 19, 1891 –Mar 3, 1897
| rowspan=3  | Democratic
| rowspan=3 align=right | Charles H. Gibson
! rowspan=3 | 19

|- style="height:2em"
| rowspan=3 | Elected in 1892.Lost re-election.
| rowspan=3 | 19
| 

|- style="height:2em"
| 

|- style="height:2em"
| 
| rowspan=3 | 19
| rowspan=3 | Elected in 1896.Retired.
| rowspan=3 nowrap | Mar 4, 1897 –Mar 3, 1903
| rowspan=3  | Republican
| rowspan=3 align=right | George L. Wellington
! rowspan=3 | 20

|- style="height:2em"
! rowspan=3 | 20
| rowspan=3 align=left | Louis E. McComas
| rowspan=3  | Republican
| rowspan=3 nowrap | Mar 4, 1899 –Mar 3, 1905
| rowspan=3 | Elected in 1898.Retired to become judge of the U.S. Court of Appeals.
| rowspan=3 | 20
| 

|- style="height:2em"
| 

|- style="height:2em"
| 
| rowspan=7 | 20
| rowspan=2 | Elected in 1902.Died.
| rowspan=2 nowrap | Mar 4, 1903 –Jun 4, 1906
| rowspan=2  | Democratic
| rowspan=2 align=right | Arthur Pue Gorman
! rowspan=2 | 21

|- style="height:2em"
! rowspan=8 | 21
| rowspan=8 align=left | Isidor Rayner
| rowspan=8  | Democratic
| rowspan=8 nowrap | Mar 4, 1905 –Nov 25, 1912
| rowspan=7 | Elected in 1904.
| rowspan=7 | 21
| rowspan=3 

|- style="height:2em"
|  
| nowrap | Jun 4, 1906 –Jun 8, 1906
| colspan=3 | Vacant

|- style="height:2em"
| rowspan=2 | Appointed to continue Gorman's term.Elected in 1908 to finish Gorman's term.Died.
| rowspan=2 nowrap | Jun 8, 1906 –Mar 17, 1908
| rowspan=2  | Democratic
| rowspan=2 align=right | William Whyte
! rowspan=2 | 22

|- style="height:2em"
| rowspan=3 

|- style="height:2em"
|  
| nowrap | Mar 17, 1908 –Mar 25, 1908
| colspan=3 | Vacant

|- style="height:2em"
| Elected to finish Gorman's term, having already been elected to the next term.
| rowspan=10 nowrap | Mar 25, 1908 –Mar 3, 1921
| rowspan=10  | Democratic
| rowspan=10 align=right | John Walter Smith
! rowspan=10 | 23

|- style="height:2em"
| 
| rowspan=6 | 21
| rowspan=6 | Elected in 1908.

|- style="height:2em"
| Re-elected in 1910.Died.
| rowspan=6 | 22
| rowspan=3 

|- style="height:2em"
| colspan=3 | Vacant
| nowrap | Nov 25, 1912 –Nov 29, 1912
|  

|- style="height:2em"
! rowspan=2 | 22
| rowspan=2 align=left | William P. Jackson
| rowspan=2  | Republican
| rowspan=2 nowrap | Nov 29, 1912 –Jan 28, 1914
| rowspan=2 | Appointed to continue Rayner's term.Retired when successor elected.

|- style="height:2em"
| rowspan=2 

|- style="height:2em"
! rowspan=2 | 23
| rowspan=2 align=left | Blair Lee
| rowspan=2  | Democratic
| rowspan=2 nowrap | Jan 28, 1914 –Mar 3, 1917
| rowspan=2 | Elected in 1913 to finish Rayner's term.Lost re-election.

|- style="height:2em"
| 
| rowspan=3 | 22
| rowspan=3 | Re-elected in 1914.Lost re-election.

|- style="height:2em"
! rowspan=3 | 24
| rowspan=3 align=left | Joseph I. France
| rowspan=3  | Republican
| rowspan=3 nowrap | Mar 4, 1917 –Mar 3, 1923
| rowspan=3 | Elected in 1916.Lost re-election.
| rowspan=3 | 23
| 

|- style="height:2em"
| 

|- style="height:2em"
| 
| rowspan=3 | 23
| rowspan=3 | Elected in 1920.Lost re-election.
| rowspan=3 nowrap | Mar 4, 1921 –Mar 3, 1927
| rowspan=3  | Republican
| rowspan=3 align=right | Ovington Weller
! rowspan=3 | 24

|- style="height:2em"
! rowspan=3 | 25
| rowspan=3 align=left | William Cabell Bruce
| rowspan=3  | Democratic
| rowspan=3 nowrap | Mar 4, 1923 –Mar 3, 1929
| rowspan=3 | Elected in 1922.Lost re-election.
| rowspan=3 | 24
| 

|- style="height:2em"
| 

|- style="height:2em"
| 
| rowspan=3 | 24
| rowspan=3 | Elected in 1926.
| rowspan=12 nowrap | Mar 4, 1927 –Jan 3, 1951
| rowspan=12  | Democratic
| rowspan=12 align=right | Millard Tydings
! rowspan=12 | 25

|- style="height:2em"
! rowspan=3 | 26
| rowspan=3 align=left | Phillips Lee Goldsborough
| rowspan=3  | Republican
| rowspan=3 nowrap | Mar 4, 1929 –Jan 3, 1935
| rowspan=3 | Elected in 1928.Retired to run for Governor.
| rowspan=3 | 25
| 

|- style="height:2em"
| 

|- style="height:2em"
| 
| rowspan=3 | 25
| rowspan=3 | Re-elected in 1932.

|- style="height:2em"
! rowspan=6 | 27
| rowspan=6 align=left | George L. P. Radcliffe
| rowspan=6  | Democratic
| rowspan=6 nowrap | Jan 3, 1935 –Jan 3, 1947
| rowspan=3 | Elected in 1934.
| rowspan=3 | 26
| 

|- style="height:2em"
| 

|- style="height:2em"
| 
| rowspan=3 | 26
| rowspan=3 | Re-elected in 1938.

|- style="height:2em"
| rowspan=3 | Re-elected in 1940.Lost renomination.
| rowspan=3 | 27
| 

|- style="height:2em"
| 

|- style="height:2em"
| 
| rowspan=3 | 27
| rowspan=3 | Re-elected in 1944.Lost re-election.

|- style="height:2em"
! rowspan=3 | 28
| rowspan=3 align=left | Herbert O'Conor
| rowspan=3  | Democratic
| rowspan=3 nowrap | Jan 3, 1947 –Jan 3, 1953
| rowspan=3 | Elected in 1946.Retired.
| rowspan=3 | 28
| 

|- style="height:2em"
| 

|- style="height:2em"
| 
| rowspan=3 | 28
| rowspan=3 | Elected in 1950.
| rowspan=6 nowrap | Jan 3, 1951 –Jan 3, 1963
| rowspan=6  | Republican
| rowspan=6 align=right | John Marshall Butler
! rowspan=6 | 26

|- style="height:2em"
! rowspan=6 | 29
| rowspan=6 align=left | J. Glenn Beall
| rowspan=6  | Republican
| rowspan=6 nowrap | Jan 3, 1953 –Jan 3, 1965
| rowspan=3 | Elected in 1952.
| rowspan=3 | 29
| 

|- style="height:2em"
| 

|- style="height:2em"
| 
| rowspan=3 | 29
| rowspan=3 | Re-elected in 1956.Retired.

|- style="height:2em"
| rowspan=3 | Re-elected in 1958.Lost re-election.
| rowspan=3 | 30
| 

|- style="height:2em"
| 

|- style="height:2em"
| 
| rowspan=3 | 30
| rowspan=3 | Elected in 1962.Lost re-election.
| rowspan=3 nowrap | Jan 3, 1963 –Jan 3, 1969
| rowspan=3  | Democratic
| rowspan=3 align=right | Daniel Brewster
! rowspan=3 | 27

|- style="height:2em"
! rowspan=3 | 30
| rowspan=3 align=left | Joseph Tydings
| rowspan=3  | Democratic
| rowspan=3 nowrap | Jan 3, 1965 –Jan 3, 1971
| rowspan=3 | Elected in 1964.Lost re-election.
| rowspan=3 | 31
| 

|- style="height:2em"
| 

|- style="height:2em"
| 
| rowspan=3 | 31
| rowspan=3 | Elected in 1968.
| rowspan=9 nowrap | Jan 3, 1969 –Jan 3, 1987
| rowspan=9  | Republican
| rowspan=9 align=right | Charles Mathias
! rowspan=9 | 28

|- style="height:2em"
! rowspan=3 | 31
| rowspan=3 align=left | J. Glenn Beall Jr.
| rowspan=3  | Republican
| rowspan=3 nowrap | Jan 3, 1971 –Jan 3, 1977
| rowspan=3 | Elected in 1970.Lost re-election.
| rowspan=3 | 32
| 

|- style="height:2em"
| 

|- style="height:2em"
| 
| rowspan=3 | 32
| rowspan=3 | Re-elected in 1974.

|- style="height:2em"
! rowspan=15 | 32
| rowspan=15 align=left | Paul Sarbanes
| rowspan=15  | Democratic
| rowspan=15 nowrap | Jan 3, 1977 –Jan 3, 2007
| rowspan=3 | Elected in 1976.
| rowspan=3 | 33
| 

|- style="height:2em"
| 

|- style="height:2em"
| 
| rowspan=3 | 33
| rowspan=3 | Re-elected in 1980.Retired.

|- style="height:2em"
| rowspan=3 | Re-elected in 1982.
| rowspan=3 | 34
| 

|- style="height:2em"
| 

|- style="height:2em"
| 
| rowspan=3 | 34
| rowspan=3 | Elected in 1986.
| rowspan=15 nowrap | Jan 3, 1987 –Jan 3, 2017
| rowspan=15  | Democratic
| rowspan=15 align=right | Barbara Mikulski
! rowspan=15 | 29

|- style="height:2em"
| rowspan=3 | Re-elected in 1988.
| rowspan=3 | 35
| 

|- style="height:2em"
| 

|- style="height:2em"
| 
| rowspan=3 | 35
| rowspan=3 | Re-elected in 1992.

|- style="height:2em"
| rowspan=3 | Re-elected in 1994.
| rowspan=3 | 36
| 

|- style="height:2em"
| 

|- style="height:2em"
| 
| rowspan=3 | 36
| rowspan=3 | Re-elected in 1998.

|- style="height:2em"
| rowspan=3 | Re-elected in 2000.Retired.
| rowspan=3 | 37
| 

|- style="height:2em"
| 

|- style="height:2em"
| 
| rowspan=3 | 37
| rowspan=3 | Re-elected in 2004.

|- style="height:2em"
! rowspan=9 | 33
| rowspan=9 align=left | Ben Cardin
| rowspan=9  | Democratic
| rowspan=9 nowrap | Jan 3, 2007 –Present
| rowspan=3 | Elected in 2006.
| rowspan=3 | 38
| 

|- style="height:2em"
| 

|- style="height:2em"
| 
| rowspan=3 | 38
| rowspan=3 | Re-elected in 2010.Retired.

|- style="height:2em"
| rowspan=3 | Re-elected in 2012.
| rowspan=3 | 39
| 

|- style="height:2em"
| 

|- style="height:2em"
| 
| rowspan=3 | 39
| rowspan=3 | Elected in 2016.
| rowspan=6 nowrap | Jan 3, 2017 –Present
| rowspan=6  | Democratic
| rowspan=6 align=right | Chris Van Hollen
! rowspan=6 | 30

|- style="height:2em"
| rowspan=3 | Re-elected in 2018.
| rowspan=3 | 40
| 

|- style="height:2em"
| 

|- style="height:2em"
| 
| rowspan=3 | 40
| rowspan=3 | Re-elected in 2022.

|- style="height:2em"
| rowspan=3 colspan=5 | To be determined in the 2024 election.
| rowspan=3| 41
| 

|- style="height:2em"
| 

|- style="height:2em"
| 
| 41
| colspan=5 | To be determined in the 2028 election.

See also

 United States congressional delegations from Maryland
 List of United States representatives from Maryland
 Elections in Maryland

References 

 

 
United States Senate
Maryland